The 38th National Film Awards, presented by Directorate of Film Festivals, the organisation set up by Ministry of Information and Broadcasting, India to felicitate the best of Indian Cinema released in the year 1990. Ceremony took place in 1991.

With 38th National Film Awards, couple of new awards were instituted for Non-Feature films section. These awards includes Best Investigative Film, Best Audiography, Best Cinematography and Best Editing.

Awards 

Awards were divided into feature films, non-feature films and books written on Indian cinema.

Lifetime Achievement Award

Feature films 

Feature films were awarded at All India as well as regional level. For 38th National Film Awards, a Tamil film, Marupakkam won the National Film Award for Best Feature Film, whereas a Hindi film, Lekin... won the maximum number of awards (5). Following were the awards given in each category:

Juries 

A committee headed by veteran actor Ashok Kumar was appointed to evaluate the feature films awards. Following were the jury members:

 Jury Members
 Ashok Kumar (Chairperson)Usha KhannaP. V. GangadharanHoney IraniJanardhan RoyRaj BisariaT. Subbarami ReddySripriyaKomal SwaminathanJ. P. DasRekha SahayG. V. IyerT. S. NarasimhanBhupen HazarikaKalpana LajmiPremlata BajpaiShaji N. Karun

All India Award 

Following were the awards given:

Golden Lotus Award 

Official Name: Swarna Kamal

All the awardees are awarded with 'Golden Lotus Award (Swarna Kamal)', a certificate and cash prize.

Silver Lotus Award 

Official Name: Rajat Kamal

All the awardees are awarded with 'Silver Lotus Award (Rajat Kamal)', a certificate and cash prize.

Regional Awards 

The award is given to best film in the regional languages in India.

Best Feature Film in Each of the Language Other Than Those Specified in the Schedule VIII of the Constitution

Non-Feature Films 

Short Films made in any Indian language and certified by the Central Board of Film Certification as a documentary/newsreel/fiction are eligible for non-feature film section.

Juries 

A committee headed by S. Krishnaswamy was appointed to evaluate the non-feature films awards. Following were the jury members:

 Jury Members
 S. Krishnaswamy (Chairperson)Madan BawariaPramod MathurVijaya NirmalaSwapan Ghose

Golden Lotus Award 

Official Name: Swarna Kamal

All the awardees are awarded with 'Golden Lotus Award (Swarna Kamal)', a certificate and cash prize.

Silver Lotus Award 

Official Name: Rajat Kamal

All the awardees are awarded with 'Silver Lotus Award (Rajat Kamal)' and cash prize.

Best Writing on Cinema 

The awards aim at encouraging study and appreciation of cinema as an art form and dissemination of information and critical appreciation of this art-form through publication of books, articles, reviews etc.

Juries 

A committee headed by Amita Malik was appointed to evaluate the writing on Indian cinema. Following were the jury members:

 Jury Members
 Amita Malik (Chairperson)Vinod BhardwajPunathil Kunjabdulla

Golden Lotus Award 
Official Name: Swarna Kamal

All the awardees are awarded with 'Golden Lotus Award (Swarna Kamal)' and cash prize.

Silver Lotus Award 
Official Name: Rajat Kamal

All the awardees are awarded with 'Silver Lotus Award (Rajat Kamal)' and cash prize.

Awards not given 

Following were the awards not given as no film was found to be suitable for the award:

 Best Children's Film
 Best Feature Film on National Integration
 Best Film on Family Welfare
 Best Film on Environment Conservation / Preservation
 Best Feature Film in English
 Best Feature Film in Marathi
 Best Feature Film in Oriya
 Best Feature Film in Punjabi
 Best Promotional Film
 Best Historical Reconstruction / Compilation Film
 Best Non-Feature Film on Family Welfare
 Best Animation Film
 Best First Non-Feature Film
 Best Non-Feature Film Direction

References

External links 
 National Film Awards Archives
 Official Page for Directorate of Film Festivals, India

National Film Awards (India) ceremonies
1991 Indian film awards